Wenger is a surname of German origin with a European concentration of the name in Switzerland. It was recorded as early as 1728 in America when an Eva Grabiel was married to a Christian Wenger in Lancaster County, Pennsylvania.  Many of its early American bearers were Mennonites. Other - rather seldom - forms of the same name are Wanger and Winger. 

Notable people with the surname include:

 Albert Wenger, German-American businessman and venture capitalist
 Andrew Wenger (born 1990), American soccer player
 Antoine Wenger (1919–2009), French priest, Patristics scholar and journalist
 Arsène Wenger (born 1949), French professional footballer and manager
 Brittany Wenger (born 1994), American winner of the Google Science Fair in 2012
 Don S. Wenger (1911–1986), Major General in the United States Air Force
 Éric Wenger, computer programmer
 Étienne Wenger (born 1952), educational theorist and practitioner from Switzerland
 Fridolin Wenger (died 1931, Swiss footballer 
 J. C. Wenger (John Christian Wenger 1910–1995), American Mennonite theologian and professor
 John Wenger (John Weaver Wenger 1778–1851), founder of the Pentecostal Church of the Brethren, popularly known as the Wengerites
 John Wenger (missionary) (1811–1880), Swiss missionary and orientalist
 John Wenger (artist) (1887–1976), Russian-American artist and scenographist, winner of the Rome Prize
 Joseph Wenger (1901–1970), Rear-Admiral of the United States Navy
 Joseph Wenger (bishop) (1868–1956), American Old Order Mennonite preacher
 Jürg Wenger (born 1969), Swiss skeleton racer who competed from 1991 to 2003
 Lauren Wenger (born 1984), American water polo player
 Leopold Wenger (1874–1953), Austrian historian
 Lisa Wenger (1858–1941), Swiss painter
 Livio Wenger (born 1993), Swiss skater
 Louis Wenger (1809–1861), Swiss architect and politician
 Marion A. (Gus) Wenger (1907–1982), American psychologist 
 Marta Wenger (born 1953), South African politician
 Michael Wenger (born 1947), Amerian Soto Zen priest
 Mireille Wenger, South African politician
 Nanette Kass Wenger (born 1930), American clinical cardiologist 
 Noah W. Wenger (born 1934), Pennsylvania State Senator
 Peter Wenger (1944–2016), Swiss international footballer
 Piers Wenger (born 1972), British television producer
 Susanne Wenger, also known as Adunni Olorisha (c. 1915–2015), Austrian artist
 Ulrich Wenger (born 1944), Swiss cross-country skier
 Walter Wenger, Swiss wrestler
 Helen Gibson, born Rose August Wenger (1892–1977), American film actress and first American stuntwoman

See also 
 Wengert

References